Kakepuku (Kakipuku-o-kahurere) is a volcanic cone which rises from the plain between the Waipā and Puniu rivers, about  NW of Te Kawa and  SW of Te Awamutu in the Waikato region of New Zealand's North Island.

Geology 

The 'Geology of the Waikato Area' says, "The Alexandra Volcanic Group consists of several low-angle composite cones, including Karioi, Pirongia, Kakepuku, Te Kawa and Tokanui volcanoes, aligned southeast from Mount Karioi on the coast to Tokanui. They comprise about 55 km3 of mainly basaltic material erupted from at least 40 volcanic centres. The Alexandra Volcanic Group is the product oflate Pliocene to earliest Pleistocene back-arc volcanism, when both subduction-related basaltic magmas (Karioi, Pirongia, Kakepuku and Te Kawa) and intraplate alkalic basalts (Okete) were erupted. K-Ar ages range from 2.74 to 1.6 Ma, with the ages of the different magma series overlapping". It goes on to say Kakepuku is "composed mainly of basalt lava with minor tuff ". Kakepuku was formed about 2.5 million years ago.

History 
Kakepuku was named by Rakataura, a Tainui tohunga. One version says it was in memory of the shape of his pregnant wife, Kahurere. In Māori legend, Kakepuku travelled north in search of his father, until he reached the Waipa plain and fell in love with Te Kawa, daughter of Pirongia and Taupiri Mountains. However, he had a rival in Karewa, who also stood nearby. The mountains fought, Karewa lost and, pursued by Kakepuku's rocks, fled into the Tasman Sea, now also known as Kārewa / Gannet Island. So Kakepuku remains guarding Te Kawa.

DOC says, "Tainui settlement in the Kakepuku area began about 1550AD, although there were probably earlier people's present - notably Ngati Kahupungapunga (see history of Tokoroa)." It is in the Ngāti Maniapoto area (see also http://www.teara.govt.nz/en/ngati-maniapoto/1). Four pā sites are hidden under forest or regenerating bush. The District Plan lists 40 sites of pits, terraces and pās on Kakepuku, predominantly on the north side. Ferdinand Hochstetter, who visited in 1859, said the top of the mountain was known as Hikurangi, arch of heaven.

Waipa County Council built the lookout tower in 1977.

Walking track 
DOC says, "From the car park there is a new walking track to the summit. This incorporates the mountain biking track for part of the way. This track is an old farm road and is of an even gradient. The bottom 3/4 of this track is also able to be used by mountain bikers. Once at the top continue along a ridge through a fine remnant of original forest in the ancient crater and finally onto the summit itself (449 m, marked with a trig)."

Conservation 
Kakepuku Mountain Conservation Project covers 198 ha including Kakepuku Mountain Historic Reserve (administered by DOC), adjacent Waipa District Council reserve and private land. The project was established in 1995 out of concern for the health of native bush on Kakepuku Maunga. The aim has been to reduce possum, rat and goat populations to levels where minimal impact on forest and native birds would occur. 30 North Island robins were reintroduced in 1999 and later the New Zealand falcon, weedy portions on the fringe of the mountain were replanted with native plants and tūī and kererū are also present. Plants in the reserve include tawa, rewarewa, kohekohe, mangeao and pukatea. Kakepuku also has filmy fern and king fern. Gold-striped gecko and Auckland green gecko are also on the mountain.

Gallery

References

External links
 
Plant species list

Hills of New Zealand
Volcanoes of Waikato
Waipa District
Pliocene volcanoes
Pleistocene volcanoes